Taramazd (also Romanized as Ţarāmazd; also known as Tārah Mazd, Tareh Mozd, Tarmazd, Tarmozd, and Teramis) is a village in Mashhad-e Miqan Rural District, in the Central District of Arak County, Markazi Province, Iran. At the 2006 census, its population was 425, in 129 families.

References 

Populated places in Arak County